The Tuesday Club is an informal group of foreign diplomats based in Dhaka, Bangladesh. The group comprises the United States, Canada, UK, Australia, EU, and Japan. All the nations in the Tuesday Club are major donor nations to the People's Republic of Bangladesh.

According to newspaper editor Nurul Kabir, the Tuesday Club was primarily responsible for the military takeover by the Bangladesh Army in January 2007.

References

External links
Calls for investigation into Australian conduct in Bangladesh Australian Broadcasting Corporation Report by Peter Lloyd

Political organisations based in Bangladesh